Prasophyllum sargentii, commonly known as the frilled leek orchid, is a species of orchid endemic to the south-west of Western Australia. It is a tall orchid with a single smooth, tubular leaf and up to thirty or more purplish and white or golden brown and white flowers with a frilled labellum.

Description
The petals face forwards and the lateral sepals are erect, white and fused at their edges. The labellum is white, suffused with pink, has frilly edges and is turned upwards towards the lateral sepals. Flowering occurs from August to October and is stimulated by fire or light disturbance.

Taxonomy and naming
The frilled leek orchid was first formally described in 1948 by William Nicholls who gave it the name Prasophyllum australe var. sargentii and published the description in The Victorian Naturalist. In 1971, Alex George raised it to species status, noting that the species P. australe does not occur in Western Australia. The specific epithet (sargentii) honours Oswald Sargent, the collector of the type specimen.

Distribution and habitat
The frilled leek orchid  grows in sandy soil in shrubland and woodland, usually flowering after fire or light disturbance. It occurs from Kalbarri in the north to Israelite Bay in the east.

Conservation
Prasophyllum sargentii is classified as "not threatened" by the Western Australian Government Department of Parks and Wildlife.

References

External links 
 
 

sargentii
Endemic flora of Western Australia
Endemic orchids of Australia
Plants described in 1948